Keele services is a motorway service station, between junctions 15 and 16 of the M6 motorway near Keele in England. Operated by Welcome Break, it was built in 1963 and was designed by Terence Verity of Verity Associates.

The nearest towns are Stoke-on-Trent and Newcastle-under-Lyme. Close by is Keele University and it is possible to walk and/or drive from the university grounds to the Service Station, and this has been a popular route for students.

Both sides of the site have Welcome Break petrol stations, W H Smith and Starbucks. There are KFC and Burger King restaurants on the bridge over the motorway.

History
Keele was an exact copy of Charnock Richard; Keele opened on Friday 15 November 1963.

On 27 August 1984, a fire ripped through the service station bridge at Keele, between its two bases, but there were no injuries. There was a plan for a hotel to be built here but this never happened.

References

External links
 Motorway Services Online - Keele
 Motorway Services.
 Welcome Break.

M6 motorway service stations
Welcome Break motorway service stations
Borough of Newcastle-under-Lyme
Transport in Staffordshire